Konechnoye is a rural locality (a village) in Yugskoye Rural Settlement, Cherepovetsky District, Vologda Oblast, Russia. The population was 30 as of 2002. There are 12 streets.

Geography 
Bolshaya Novinka is the nearest rural locality.

References 

Rural localities in Cherepovetsky District